Michael Pinske (born 22 August 1985) is a German judoka. His mother, Andrea Pollack, won three Olympic gold medals in swimming.

Achievements

References

External links
 
 

1985 births
Living people
German male judoka
Judoka at the 2008 Summer Olympics
Olympic judoka of Germany